Dimorphocrambus is a genus of moths of the family Crambidae. It contains only one species, Dimorphocrambus espeletiae, which is found in Venezuela.

References

Crambini
Monotypic moth genera
Moths of South America
Crambidae genera